Caroline Agnes Morgan Thomson, Baroness Liddle (born 15 May 1954) was chair of the charity Oxfam until October 2020. She is a former BBC executive and was the Corporation's chief operating officer, from 2006 to 2012 and she stood in for Mark Thompson, the former director general, when necessary.

Early life and career
Thomson is the elder daughter of Labour peer George Thomson, Baron Thomson of Monifieth. She was educated at Mary Datchelor Girls' School in Camberwell, a grammar school, and graduated from York University, where she studied history and economics.

She first joined the BBC as a journalist trainee in 1975, ultimately becoming a producer on Analysis (Radio 4) and later Panorama (BBC1) before becoming personal assistant to SDP leader Roy Jenkins in 1982. She spent over a decade at Channel 4 from 1984, initially as a commissioning editor, later as Head of Corporate Affairs from 1990, before rejoining the BBC in 1996 as Deputy Director of the World Service. She became the Corporation's Director of Policy and Legal Affairs in July 2000, a job description later expanded to include Strategy, before being promoted to chief operating officer in 2006. In 2011 she was paid £385,000 by the organisation. The Commons Public Accounts Committee suggested that her £670,000 redundancy pay-off was effectively paid to "compensate" her for missing out on the job of director-general.

In October 2013 she became Executive Director of the English National Ballet.

Since November 2012, she has been Chair of Digital UK. She is also chair of Tomorrow's People Trust's Ambassadors group and Trustee to a number of charities including the National Gallery.

Personal life
Caroline Thomson is married to the Labour peer Roger Liddle, an advisor to Tony Blair while Blair was Prime Minister.

References

1954 births
Living people
People educated at Mary Datchelor School
Alumni of the University of York
BBC executives
BBC World Service people
Liddle
British journalists
British radio executives
Channel 4 people
Social Democratic Party (UK) people
English television editors
Women television editors
Spouses of life peers
Daughters of life peers